John Farrington was an early American colonist. He settled in Dedham, Massachusetts and served as a selectman there. When the town of Wrentham separated, he became one of the first settlers there. Later, he would become one of the founders of Deerfield, Massachusetts. His wife, Mary Bullard, was the cousin of Quentin Stockwell's wife Abigail. The Stockwells were also original settlers of Deerfield. He was the ancestor of Representative John Farrington.

References

Works cited

Dedham, Massachusetts selectmen
Kingdom of England emigrants to Massachusetts Bay Colony
People from colonial Dedham, Massachusetts
Year of birth missing
Year of death missing